R351 road may refer to:
 R351 road (Ireland)
 R351 road (South Africa)